Dale Anthony Berra (born December 13, 1956) is an American former Major League Baseball player who primarily played as an infielder from  to . He is the son of Hall of Fame catcher Yogi Berra and brother of former Baltimore Colts return specialist Tim Berra.

Early years
Dale was named after Dale Mitchell, who had made the final out in Don Larsen's perfect game two months earlier, when he took a called third strike that was caught by Yogi.

Berra was a highly sought prospect upon his graduation from Montclair High School in Montclair, New Jersey. He was drafted by the Pittsburgh Pirates with the twentieth overall pick in the 1975 Major League Baseball draft, and made his major league debut on August 22, 1977, at the age of twenty.

Pittsburgh Pirates
Berra was a member of the 1979 World Series champion Pirates, though he did not receive an at-bat in the post season. That season, he enjoyed career highs in batting average (.263), hits (139), runs scored (64) and runs batted in (61). In 1983, he set the record for reaching base on catcher's interference with seven.

New York Yankees
Yogi Berra was named manager of the Yankees prior to the start of the  season. Following the season, the Yankees acquired the younger Berra, along with Jay Buhner and Alfonso Pulido for Steve Kemp and Tim Foli, whom Berra had replaced as the Pirates starting shortstop. Dale became the first son to play for his father in the major leagues since Earle Mack who appeared in a total of 5 games for the Philadelphia Athletics from 1910 through 1914 under Connie Mack. Dale was batting .343 until his father was fired sixteen games into the  season and replaced by Billy Martin. Under Martin, Dale was returned to a back-up infielder role, and his batting average fell to .229 for the season.

The most notable play of Berra's career was a bizarre baserunning gaffe which also involved Bobby Meacham in an 11-inning 6–5 loss to the Chicago White Sox at Yankee Stadium on August 2, 1985. With Meacham and Berra the runners at second and first base respectively in the seventh inning of a game tied at three, Rickey Henderson hit a ball that rolled to the farthest reaches of left-center field. When Meacham slipped between second and third base, both runners ended up approaching home plate in synchronized fashion, one on the heels of the other. After catching the relay throw from shortstop Ozzie Guillén, catcher Carlton Fisk tagged out Meacham to his right, then turned to his left just a split second later to do the same to Berra to complete the double play. Martin commented, "I've never seen that in grammar school, much less a major-league game."

Pittsburgh drug trials

On September 9, 1985, Berra testified during the cocaine distribution trial of Curtis Strong that he shared cocaine with other members of the Pirates.

On February 28, Baseball Commissioner Peter Ueberroth suspended several players including Berra. The suspensions were waived with a commitment for community service and donations of 10% of their salaries for one year.

Houston Astros
Shortly afterwards, he was signed by the Houston Astros where Yogi Berra was a coach. Dale spent the rest of the 1986 season with Houston's triple-A affiliate.

He batted .178 in 19 games for the Astros, and was released at the end of the season. He spent the  season in the Baltimore Orioles' system before retiring.

Personal life
A resident of Glen Ridge, New Jersey, Berra was charged in April 1989 with cocaine possession as part of an investigation into a drug ring that was distributing as much as $20,000 in cocaine weekly in northern New Jersey. After three years in the Pretrial Intervention Program, the charges were dismissed.

In 1990, Berra was running a construction company in Cranford, New Jersey.
He’s now one of the principals of LTD Enterprises, which controls the brand image of his father.

Berra played more games than any son of a Hall-of-Famer, topping Dick Sisler (853 to 799). His older brother, Larry, played briefly in the New York Mets organization, and his older brother, Tim, played with the Baltimore Colts in 1974.

See also
List of second-generation Major League Baseball players
List of sportspeople sanctioned for doping offenses

References

External links

1956 births
Living people
American people of Italian descent
Baseball players from New Jersey
Charleston Patriots players
Columbus Clippers players
Houston Astros players
Major League Baseball players suspended for drug offenses 
Major League Baseball shortstops
Major League Baseball third basemen
Montclair High School (New Jersey) alumni
New York Yankees players
Niagara Falls Pirates players
Portland Beavers players
People from Glen Ridge, New Jersey
People from Montclair, New Jersey
People from Ridgewood, New Jersey
Pittsburgh Pirates players
Rochester Red Wings players
Sportspeople from Essex County, New Jersey
Tucson Toros players